Siwar Bousetta (also spelled Bouseta, born 23 July 1999) is a Tunisian freestyle wrestler. She is a bronze medalist at the African Games and a two-time medalist at the African Wrestling Championships.

Career 

She represented Tunisia at the 2019 African Games held in Rabat, Morocco and she won one of the bronze medals in the women's freestyle 57 kg event.

At the 2020 African Wrestling Championships held in Algiers, Algeria, she won one of the bronze medals in the women's 57 kg event. She qualified at the 2021 African & Oceania Wrestling Olympic Qualification Tournament to represent Tunisia at the 2020 Summer Olympics in Tokyo, Japan. She competed in the women's 57 kg event where she was eliminated in her first match by Tetyana Kit of Ukraine.

She won the silver medal in her event at the 2022 African Wrestling Championships held in El Jadida, Morocco. A few months later, she also won the silver medal in the 57 kg event at the 2022 Mediterranean Games held in Oran, Algeria. She won the bronze medal in her event at the 2022 Tunis Ranking Series event held in Tunis, Tunisia. She competed in the 57 kg event at the 2021 Islamic Solidarity Games held in Konya, Turkey. A few months later, she lost her bronze medal match in her event at the 2022 U23 World Wrestling Championships held in Pontevedra, Spain.

Achievements

References

External links 
 
 
 

1999 births
Living people
Place of birth missing (living people)
Tunisian female sport wrestlers
African Games bronze medalists for Tunisia
African Games medalists in wrestling
Competitors at the 2019 African Games
African Wrestling Championships medalists
Wrestlers at the 2020 Summer Olympics
Olympic wrestlers of Tunisia
Competitors at the 2022 Mediterranean Games
Mediterranean Games silver medalists for Tunisia
Mediterranean Games medalists in wrestling
Islamic Solidarity Games competitors for Tunisia
21st-century Tunisian women